Costoanachis translirata is a species of sea snail, a marine gastropod mollusk in the family Columbellidae, the dove snails.

Description

Distribution
This species is distributed in the Gulf of Mexico and in the Caribbean Sea

References

 Rosenberg, G., F. Moretzsohn, and E. F. García. 2009. Gastropoda (Mollusca) of the Gulf of Mexico, Pp. 579–699 in Felder, D.L. and D.K. Camp (eds.), Gulf of Mexico–Origins, Waters, and Biota. Biodiversity. Texas A&M Press, College Station, Texas.

External links

Columbellidae
Gastropods described in 1861